The Liszthaus Raiding is the birthplace of Franz Liszt in Raiding in Burgenland, Austria. Liszt was born here in 1811. Today it is a museum.

A concert hall, next to the house, was opened in 2006.

History

Liszt's time and earlier
The stone building was built in the 16th century; it was part of an estate created by von Guniafalva, a noble, and extended in the mid-17th century by his son-in-law Johann Illesy. The estate was bought in 1805 by the Esterházy family.

At that time, Raiding (Hungarian name Doborján) was in the Kingdom of Hungary. The building had a roof of wooden shingles, and had six rooms, a kitchen and a room for wine fermentation. Adam Liszt, father of the composer, was steward of the sheep on the Esterházy estate; he was also a musician, playing cello in Prince Esterházy's orchestra.

The future composer, only son of Adam Liszt and his wife Maria Anna, was born here on 22 October 1811. He was baptized the following day in the neighbouring town of Unterfrauenhaid. Franz received music lessons from his father from the age of six. Adam was unable to obtain funds for Franz's education from the Esterházy family, and the Liszts moved to Vienna in 1822.

Recent years

In 1951, after two year's renovation, the building, called a Gedächtnisstätte (place of remembrance) was officially opened. In 1971 Paul Esterházy, the last owner from the Esterházy family, gave the building to the town of Raiding.

In 1979 the building was re-opened as a museum. The concert hall, next to the house, the Lisztzentrum Raiding, was opened in 2006. Its capacity is about 580, and it is the home of the Raiding Liszt Festival. In 2011, 200 years after Liszt's birth, the contents and technology of the museum were updated.

See also 
 List of music museums

References

Birthplaces of individual people
Franz Liszt
Museums in Burgenland
Music museums in Austria
Biographical museums in Austria
Concert halls in Austria